The men's 400 metres hurdles event at the 1986 European Athletics Championships was held in Stuttgart, then West Germany, at Neckarstadion on 26, 27, and 28 August 1986.

Medalists

Results

Final
28 August

Semi-finals
27 August

Semi-final 1

Semi-final 2

Heats
26 August

Heat 1

Heat 2

Heat 3

Heat 4

Participation
According to an unofficial count, 24 athletes from 13 countries participated in the event.

 (2)
 (2)
 (1)
 (1)
 (1)
 (2)
 (2)
 (1)
 (3)
 (1)
 (3)
 (2)
 (3)

References

400 metres hurdles
400 metres hurdles at the European Athletics Championships